Nolly is a British three-part biographical miniseries, created by Russell T Davies, starring Helena Bonham Carter as Crossroads star Noele Gordon. The series premiered on 2 February 2023, on the new streaming platform ITVX and will air on ITV at a later date.

Synopsis
The series tracks the great success of the TV star "Nolly" or Noele Gordon, and then the betrayal and sudden firing that followed.

Cast
 Helena Bonham Carter as Noele Gordon
 Max Brown as Michael Summerton
 Antonia Bernath as Jane Rossington
 Bethany Antonia as Poppy Ngomo
 Mark Gatiss as Larry Grayson
 Emily Butcher as Fiona Fullerton
 Augustus Prew as Tony Adams
 Richard Lintern as Ronnie Allen
 Chloe Harris as Susan Hanson
 Clare Foster as Sue Lloyd
 Lloyd Griffith as Paul Henry
 Con O'Neill as Jack Barton
 Tim Wallers as Charles Denton
 Boro’ Brass as the Brass Band on the docks

Production
Nolly was the debut commission for Nicola Shindler's ITV-backed Quay Street Productions. In November 2021, it was announced Helena Bonham Carter would star as Noele Gordon in the three-part series.

In June 2022, it was announced Augustus Prew would play Tony Adams and Mark Gatiss would play Larry Grayson. Also joining the cast were Richard Lintern, Antonia Bernath, Bethany Antonia, Clare Foster, Chloe Harris, Lloyd Griffith, Con O'Neill, and Tim Wallers.

Principal photography took place in and around Manchester. In May 2022, Bonham Carter was spotted filming at Salford Lads' Club in Ordsall. Cast and crew were then spotted in Bolton at Le Mans Crescent.

Release
ITV shared a first look at Bonham Carter in costume in June 2022.

Critical reception
On Rotten Tomatoes, 100% of 9 critic reviews are positive for the miniseries, with an average rating of 7.6/10. On Metacritic, it has an average rating of 80 out of 100 based on 6 critic reviews, indicating "generally favorable reviews".

References

External links
 

Upcoming television series
2023 British television series debuts
2023 British television series endings
Biographical television series
ITV miniseries
Television series based on actual events
Television series created by Russell T Davies
Television series set in 1981